Sufian (also Romanized as Şūfīān) is a village in Sarchehan Rural District, Sarchehan District, Bavanat County, Fars Province, Iran. At the 2006 census, its population was 148, in 35 families.

References 

Populated places in Sarchehan County